Zantedeschia elliottiana, golden arum or golden calla lily,yellow calla lily, is a herbaceous ornamental plant in the family Araceae. It grows from a bulb. It is said to occur in the province of Mpumalanga in South Africa, although other sources say that it is not found in the wild but appears to be a hybrid of garden origin.

Description 
It is summer-flowering plant with a yellow spathe marked with purple at the base. The spathe surrounds a yellow spadix which occasionally produces a spike of bright yellow berries that are attractive to birds.

Cultivation
It (or its cultivar(s)) is a recipient of the Royal Horticultural Society's Award of Garden Merit. It has been shown that, as with other members of the family Araceae, immersing Zantedeschia elliottiana bulbs in gibberellic acid (GA3) solution and planting them at the end of February increases the emergence rate and the number of emerging shoots.

References

elliottiana
Flora of the Northern Provinces
Taxa named by Carl Linnaeus